McTaggart is a surname of Scottish or Ultonian origin. It is an Anglicisation of the Gaelic Mac an t-Sagairt, meaning "son of the priest".  Also having the forms MacTaggart and Taggart. It is common in the English-speaking nations, and may refer to:

McTaggart
 Alex McTaggart, Australian politician
 Bert McTaggart, Australian rules footballer
 Bob McTaggart, Scottish politician 
 David McTaggart, Canadian environmentalist 
 Ed McTaggart, American drummer, photographer, and artist
 Ian McTaggart-Cowan, Canadian ecologist
 J. M. E. McTaggart, British idealist philosopher
 John McTaggart (disambiguation)
 Sir John McTaggart, 1st Baronet, Scottish politician
 Lynne McTaggart, journalist and author, promoter of alternative medicine
 Patrick McTaggart-Cowan, Canadian meteorologist
 Olivia McTaggart (born 2000), pole vault athlete from New Zealand
 William McTaggart, Scottish landscape painter
 McTaggart, Saskatchewan, a village in Canada.

See also
 Taggart (disambiguation)
 MacTaggart